Tatjana Tönsmeyer (born 1968) is a German historian who studies Germany–Slovakia relations and Central European history. She is currently a professor at the University of Wuppertal. Her first book, Das Dritte Reich und die Slowakai, was based on her doctoral dissertation, while Adelige Moderne is based on her habilitation. Das Dritte Reich und die Slowakei, which focused in particular on the "advisors" Germany sent to Slovakia, received positive to mixed reviews; some reviewers thought that she ignored recent Slovak scholarship in favor of dated German scholarship.

Works

References

Historians of Slovakia
Historians of Nazism
21st-century German historians
Academic staff of the University of Wuppertal
Living people
1968 births